The British Academy Video Games Award for Debut Game is an award presented annually by the British Academy of Film and Television Arts (BAFTA). It is given in honor of the best first game from any studio or individual. 

Since its inception, the award has been given to eleven games. The category was first presented at the 8th British Academy Video Games Awards ceremony, held in 2012, with the Microsoft Studios-published title Insanely Twisted Shadow Planet as the inagurual recipient. The publishers Annapurna Interactive has received the most nominations in this category with six, followed by Xbox Game Studios with five. To date, no publisher has won in the category more than once. 

The current holder of the award is Toem, developed and published by Something We Made, which won at the 18th British Academy Games Awards in 2022.

Winners and nominees
In the following table, the years are listed as per BAFTA convention, and generally correspond to the year of game release in the United Kingdom.

Multiple nominations
The following publishers received two or more Debut Game nominations:

References

External links
British Academy Video Games Awards official website

Debut Game